The Titleholders Championship was an annual golf competition. It was established in 1937 and was a women's major championships. This event was conducted in stroke play competition, and it was played at Augusta Country Club, not Augusta National Golf Club, except in 1972 when it was contested at the Pines Needles Lodge and Golf Club in Southern Pines, North Carolina.

Patty Berg held the record for the most victories with seven, and Berg had the most consecutive wins with three.

Key

Champions

Multiple winners
This table lists the golfers who have won more than one Titleholders Championship as a major championship. Bolded years and player name indicates consecutive victories. The (a) denotes amateur golfer.

Notes
 Mickey Wright won in an 18-hole playoff over Ruth Jessen, 69-72.
 Marilynn Smith won in an 18-hole playoff over Mickey Wright, 72-73.

Winners by nationality
This table lists the total number of titles won by golfers of each nationality as a major.

See also
Chronological list of LPGA major golf champions
List of LPGA major championship winning golfers
Grand Slam (golf)

References

External links
LPGA Tour Grand Slam history

champions
Titleholders